A mood ring is a finger ring that contains a thermochromic element, or "mood stone", that changes colors based on the temperature of the finger of the wearer. Finger temperature, as long as the ambient temperature is relatively constant, is significantly determined by peripheral blood flow, which is modulated by the autonomic nervous system. A mood ring contains liquid crystals that change color depending on the temperature.

See also
Liquid crystal thermometer

References

1970s fads and trends
1970s fashion
Novelty items
Rings (jewellery)
Thermochromism